Walsh County is a county in the U.S. state of North Dakota. As of the 2020 census, the population was 10,563. Its county seat is Grafton.

History
The Dakota Territory legislature created the county on May 2, 1881, with areas partitioned from Grand and Pembina counties. It was organized on August 30 of that same year, with Grafton as county seat. It was named for George H. Walsh (1845–1913), a newspaperman and politician in Grand Forks.

Geography
Walsh County lies on the eastern side of North Dakota. Its east boundary line abuts the west boundary line of the state of Minnesota (across the Red River). The Red River flows north along the east side of the county on its way to Hudson Bay in Canada. The south branch of the Park River flows easterly through the county to discharge into the Red on the east side of the county. The terrain generally slopes to the north and east, but the highest point is its northwest corner, at 1,647' (502m) ASL.

Major highways

  Interstate 29
  U.S. Highway 81
  North Dakota Highway 17
  North Dakota Highway 18
  North Dakota Highway 32
  North Dakota Highway 35

Adjacent counties

 Pembina County – north
 Kittson County, Minnesota – northeast
 Marshall County, Minnesota – east
 Grand Forks County – south
 Nelson County – southwest
 Ramsey County – west
 Cavalier County – northwest

Protected areas

 Ardoch National Wildlife Refuge
 Fairdale Slough National Waterfowl Production Area
 National Waterfowl Production Area
 North Salt Lake State Game Management Area

Lakes

 Fairdale Slough
 Homme Lake
 North Salt Lake
 Salt Lake
 Waterloo Lake

Demographics

2000 census
As of the 2020 census, there were 12,389 people, 5,029 households, and 3,319 families in the county. The population density was 9.66/sqmi (3.73/km2). There were 5,757 housing units at an average density of 4.49/sqmi (1.73/km2). The racial makeup of the county was 94.86% White, 0.33% Black or African American, 1.02% Native American, 0.19% Asian, 0.02% Pacific Islander, 2.51% from other races, and 1.07% from two or more races. 5.65% of the population were Hispanic or Latino of any race. 39.7% were of Norwegian, 14.6% German, 8.7% Polish and 8.0% Czech ancestry.

There were 5,029 households, out of which 30.60% had children under the age of 18 living with them, 55.10% were married couples living together, 7.50% had a female householder with no husband present, and 34.00% were non-families. 31.30% of all households were made up of individuals, and 15.20% had someone living alone who was 65 years of age or older. The average household size was 2.39 and the average family size was 3.00.

The county population contained 24.90% under the age of 18, 6.50% from 18 to 24, 25.00% from 25 to 44, 24.20% from 45 to 64, and 19.30% who were 65 years of age or older. The median age was 41 years. For every 100 females there were 100.00 males. For every 100 females age 18 and over, there were 96.90 males.

The median income for a household in the county was $33,845, and the median income for a family was $41,619. Males had a median income of $28,080 versus $19,961 for females. The per capita income for the county was $16,496. About 7.70% of families and 10.90% of the population were below the poverty line, including 12.20% of those under age 18 and 8.80% of those age 65 or over.

2010 census
As of the 2010 census, there were 11,119 people, 4,746 households, and 3,021 families in the county. The population density was 8.67/sqmi (3.35/km2). There were 5,498 housing units at an average density of 4.29/sqmi (1.66/km2). The racial makeup of the county was 93.5% white, 1.5% American Indian, 0.3% Asian, 0.2% black or African American, 3.1% from other races, and 1.3% from two or more races. Those of Hispanic or Latino origin made up 8.7% of the population. In terms of ancestry, 39.7% were Norwegian, 21.6% were German, 11.0% were Polish, 9.4% were Irish, 9.3% were Czech, 5.8% were English, and 5.4% were American.

Of the 4,746 households, 25.9% had children under the age of 18 living with them, 52.4% were married couples living together, 7.1% had a female householder with no husband present, 36.3% were non-families, and 32.8% of all households were made up of individuals. The average household size was 2.27 and the average family size was 2.88. The median age was 45.9 years.

The median income for a household in the county was $44,139 and the median income for a family was $58,429. Males had a median income of $36,934 versus $26,826 for females. The per capita income for the county was $23,829. About 5.4% of families and 9.9% of the population were below the poverty line, including 10.8% of those under age 18 and 12.7% of those age 65 or over.

Communities

Cities

 Adams
 Ardoch
 Conway
 Edinburg
 Fairdale
 Fordville
 Forest River
 Grafton (county seat)
 Hoople
 Lankin
 Minto
 Park River
 Pisek

Census-designated places
 Auburn
 Nash

Unincorporated communities

 Herriott
 Veseleyville
 Voss
 Warsaw

Townships

 Acton
 Adams
 Ardoch
 Cleveland
 Dewey
 Dundee
 Eden
 Farmington
 Fertile
 Forest River
 Glenwood
 Golden
 Grafton
 Harriston
 Kensington
 Kinloss
 Lampton
 Latona
 Martin
 Medford
 Norton
 Oakwood
 Ops
 Perth
 Prairie Centre
 Pulaski
 Rushford
 St. Andrews
 Sauter
 Shepherd
 Silvesta
 Tiber
 Vernon
 Vesta
 Walsh Centre
 Walshville

Politics
Walsh County voters have traditionally voted Republican. In only one national election since 1964 has the county selected the Democratic Party candidate (as of 2020).

See also
 National Register of Historic Places listings in Walsh County, North Dakota

References

External links
 Walsh County official website
 Walsh County maps, Sheet 1 (western), Sheet 2 (eastern), North Dakota DOT

 
1881 establishments in Dakota Territory
Populated places established in 1881